Quercus morii is an uncommon Asian species of trees in the beech family Fagaceae. It has been found only in Taiwan.  It is placed in subgenus Cerris, section Cyclobalanopsis.

Quercus morii is a large tree up to 30 meters tall. Leaves can be as much as 10 cm long.

References

External links
line drawing, Flora of China Illustrations vol. 4, fig. 390, drawings 1 + 2 at upper left

morii
Endemic flora of Taiwan
Plants described in 1911
Trees of Taiwan